A toddler is a child approximately 12 to 36 months old, though definitions vary. The toddler years are a time of great cognitive, emotional and social development. The word is derived from "to toddle", which means to walk unsteadily, like a child of this age.

Developmental milestones 

Toddler development can be broken down into a number of interrelated areas. There is reasonable consensus about what these areas may include:
 Physical: growth or an increase in size.
 Gross motor: the control of large muscles which enable walking, running, jumping and climbing.
 Fine motor: the ability to control small muscles; enabling the toddler to feed themselves, draw and manipulate objects.
 Vision: the ability to see near and far and interpret what is seen.
 Hearing and speech: the ability to hear and receive information and listen (interpret), and the ability to understand and learn language and use it to communicate effectively.
 Social: the ability to interact with the world through playing with others, taking turns and fantasy play.

Although it is useful to chart defined periods of development, it is also necessary to recognize that development exists on a continuum, with considerable individual differences between children. There is a wide range of what may be considered 'normal' development. However, according to experts, there are specific milestones that should be achieved by certain ages and stages in life in order to properly grow and develop. Medical experts also point out that children develop in their own time and suggest that carers should not worry too much if a child fails to reach all the milestones for their age range. Premature birth or illness during infancy may also slow down a young child's development.

Below follows a rough breakdown of the kinds of skills and attributes which young children can be expected to have developed by different points during the toddler period.  Citations for the information given are provided here.

Early milestones and intelligence

It has long been known that markedly late achievement of developmental milestones is related to intellectual or physical disabilities. However, it was thought for a long time that within the general population no relationship between the age of passing developmental milestones and later intelligence is seen. It was only more recently discovered that early passing of developmental milestones indicates in general a higher level of intelligence. A study from 2007 based on more than 5,000 children born in the United Kingdom in 1946 showed that for every month earlier a child learned to stand, there was a gain of one half of one intelligence quotient point at age 8. Also a later 2018 study found a relationship between milestone achievement and intelligence in adulthood (in this case, the milestone used was being able to name objects/animals in pictures at less than 18 months, 18-24 months, and later than 24 months). The IQ of children who were able to form a sentence at less than 24 months of age averaged 107 points, whereas children who were able to form a sentence later than 24 months of age in young adulthood (20-34 years old) had an average IQ of 101. Early  passing developmental milestones and the head circumference up to the age of 3 years explained about 6% of variance in IQ in adulthood. In comparison, parental socioeconomic status and the child's sex explained about 23% of the variance in IQ. However, experts advise against rushing children through milestones, as long as they’re reaching them within a normal range.

Toilet training

 Readiness: The Azrin and Foxx method of toilet training introduced the first set of objective criteria for determining whether a child is prepared to begin toilet training. The child should be physiologically and psychologically capable. Physiologic preparedness describes the ability of the child to perform tasks necessary for toilet training such as controlling their anal and urethral sphincter, sitting upright, and walking. Psychological readiness describes the child's motivation to become toilet trained and their ability to understand and follow directions.
 Process training.
 Parental response.

Squatting 
Young children squat instinctively as a continuous movement from standing up whenever they want to lower themselves to ground level. One- and two-year-olds can commonly be seen playing in a stable squatting position, with feet wide apart and bottom not quite touching the floor, although at first they need to hold on to something to stand up again.

Language
Talking is the next milestone of which parents are typically aware. A toddler's first word often occurs around 12 months, but this is only an average. The child will then continue to steadily add to his or her vocabulary until around the age of 18 months when language increases rapidly. He or she may learn as many as 7–9 new words a day. Around this time, toddlers generally know about 50 words. At 21 months is when toddlers begin to incorporate two word phrases into their vocabulary, such as "I go", "mama give", and "baby play". Before going to sleep they often engage in a monologue called crib talk in which they practice conversational skills. At this age, children are becoming very proficient at conveying their wants and needs to their parents in a verbal fashion."If I want it, it's mine.
If I give it to you and change my mind later, it's mine.
If I can take it away from you, it's mine.
If I had it a little while ago, it's mine.
If it's mine it will never belong to anyone else, no matter what.
If we are building something together, all the pieces are mine.
If it looks like mine, it's mine."
Poem about the social lives of young children written by Burton L. White in his Raising a Happy, Unspoiled Child

Emotions and self-image
There are several other important milestones that are achieved in this time period that parents tend not to emphasize as much as walking and talking. Gaining the ability to point at whatever it is the child wants you to see shows huge psychological gains in a toddler. This generally happens before a child's first birthday.

This age is sometimes referred to as "the terrible twos", because of the temper tantrums for which they are famous. This stage can begin as early as nine months old depending on the child and environment. Toddlers tend to have temper tantrums because they have such strong emotions but do not know how to express themselves the way that older children and adults do. Immediate causes can include physical factors such as hunger, discomfort and fatigue or a child's desire to gain greater independence and control of the environment around them. The toddler is discovering that they are a separate being from their parent and are testing their boundaries in learning the way the world around them works. Although the toddler is in their exploratory phase, it is also important to understand that the methods used by the parents for communicating with the toddler can either set off a tantrum or calm the situation. Research has shown that parents with histories of maltreatment, violence exposure, and related psychopathology may have particular difficulty in responding sensitively and in a developmentally appropriate manner to their toddlers' tantrums and thus may benefit from parent-child mental health consultation. This time between the ages of two and five when they are reaching for independence repeats itself during adolescence.

Self-awareness is another milestone that helps parents understand how a toddler is reacting. Around 18 months of age, a child will begin to recognize himself or herself as a separate physical being with his/her own thoughts and actions. A parent can test if this milestone has been reached by noticing if the toddler recognizes that their reflection in a mirror is in fact themselves. One way to test this is the rouge test: putting lipstick on the child's face and showing them their own reflection. Upon seeing the out-of-the-ordinary mark, if the child reaches to his or her own face, the child has achieved this important milestone. Along with self recognition comes feelings of embarrassment and pride that the child had not previously experienced.

See also 
 Child development stages
 Early childhood
 Early childhood education
 Sign language in infants and toddlers

References

External links 
 
 
 

Childhood